John Quinn (April 14, 1870 in Tiffin, Ohio – July 28, 1924 in Fostoria, Ohio) was an Irish-American cognoscente of the art world and a lawyer in New York City who fought to overturn censorship laws restricting modern literature and art from entering the United States.

Quinn was an important patron of chief figures in Post-impressionism and literary Modernism, a major collector of modern art and original manuscripts, and the first to exhibit these works after winning legal battles against censorship and cultural isolation.  In the 1920s he owned the largest single collection of modern European paintings in the world. He fought key legal battles that opened American culture to 20th century art movements, including his Congressional appeals to overturn the Payne–Aldrich Tariff Act.

He was part of the group who staged the Armory Show in 1913, the first great exhibition of European and American modern art in the United States, at the 69th Regiment Armory in New York. Quinn gave practical advice and financial assistance to Ezra Pound and T.S. Eliot. In gratitude, Eliot sent Quinn the original manuscript of his 1922 poem The Waste Land, including Pound's editorial suggestions.

Biography

Quinn was born in Tiffin, Ohio, one of seven children (only two of whom are known to have survived childhood) born to an Irish baker and grocer, James William Quinn, and his wife, Mary ( Quinlan). He grew up in nearby Fostoria, where his parents had relocated in 1871, a year after John's birth. His paternal grandparents, James, a blacksmith, and Mary (née Madigan) Quinn, natives of County Limerick, had settled in Tiffin in 1851.

After graduating from the University of Michigan and Georgetown University Law School, followed by a degree in international relations from Harvard University, Quinn became a successful New York lawyer, getting involved in New York’s Tammany Hall politics, but when his candidate did not get the nomination at the 1912 Democratic National Convention he became disgusted with the whole system and became an art patron, art collector, and collector of manuscripts.  

By 1910, Quinn’s tastes in art had become more worldly. Naturalistic portraits and loosely painted landscapes by English and Irish artists were only the foundation of his collection. As the second decade of the 20th-century began, his interests shifted across the English Channel to works by Manet, Camille Pissarro, and Pierre Puvis de Chavannes. He began to buy traditional paintings, drawings, sculpture and decorative art from China and Japan. His French adviser for Post-Impressionist art was Henri-Pierre Roche, who later wrote the novel Jules et Jim. Quinn and Roche worked together to develop the famous 1913 Armory Show.

Quinn was a principal supporter and purchaser of manuscripts of novelist Joseph Conrad during his lifetime. He met Irish poet W. B. Yeats in 1902 and became a major supporter, helping him found the Abbey Theatre.

According to author Richard Spence, Quinn was a supporter of the Irish nationalist cause and associated with figures such as John Devoy and Roger Casement, although he had reportedly worked for British Intelligence services before, during, and after World War I. In this role he acted as case officer for, among others, Aleister Crowley, who was an agent provocateur posing as an Irish nationalist in order to infiltrate anti-British groups of Irish and Germans in the United States.

In the early 1920s Quinn represented Margaret Anderson and Jane Heap for their publication in The Little Review of serial portions of James Joyce's Ulysses, which the U.S. Post Office had found "obscene". 

Quinn was a friend of American poet Ezra Pound. Quinn gave financial assistance to Pound and T.S. Eliot, and helped Eliot to negotiate contracts with U.S. publishers. In gratitude, Eliot sent Quinn the original manuscript of The Waste Land in 1923, containing editorial suggestions by Pound and Vivienne Eliot written on the drafts. 

The Waste Land manuscript was presumed lost for many years. It was rediscovered in 1968 in the Berg Collection of the New York Public Library, which had purchased some of Quinn's manuscripts in 1958. Rediscovery of The Waste Land manuscript was announced in conjunction with the publication of Benjamin Lawrence Reid's biography, The Man from New York: John Quinn and His Friends in  1968.

Art promotion
In 1913, he convinced the United States Congress to overturn the 1909 Payne–Aldrich Tariff Act, which retained the duty on foreign works of art less than 20 years old, discouraging Americans from collecting modern European art. A huge and controversial event, the 1913 Armory Show (officially The International Exhibition of Modern Art) in New York City included examples of Symbolism, Impressionism, Post-Impressionism, Neo-Impressionism, and Cubism. Quinn opened the exhibition with the words:

In 1913 Quinn represented Margaret Kieley in a $2,000,000 legal contest over the Last Will and Testament of her husband Timothy J. Kieley's estate. Margaret prevailed because her husband's nephews and nieces could not produce vital witnesses and defaulted.

Estate sale

Quinn died at age 54 of intestinal cancer and was buried by his family in his native Fostoria.  

Believing no American museum would appreciate his collection of modern art and wanting to provide for his sister, Julia Quinn Anderson, he wrote a will in 1918 directing that the collection be liquidated upon his death.

In 1927, an exhibition and sale of Quinn's art collection took place in New York City.  The event included works by Henri Matisse, André Derain, Maurice de Vlaminck, Robert Delaunay, Jacques Villon, Albert Gleizes, Jean Metzinger, Gino Severini, Marie Laurencin, Constantin Brâncuși, and Raymond Duchamp-Villon, in addition to American artists Arthur B. Davies, Walt Kuhn, Marsden Hartley, Stanton Macdonald-Wright, and Max Weber.  The sale was conducted by Otto Bernet and Hiram H. Parke at the American Art Galleries.  A catalog was published for the occasion by the American Art Association.

Works from Quinn's collection

References

Further reading
 Reid, Benjamin Lawrence. The Man from New York: John Quinn and His Friends, 1968. (1969 Pulitzer Prize for Biography or Autobiography)
 Londraville, Richard and Janis. Dear Yeats, Dear Pound, Dear Ford: Jeanne Robert Foster and Her Circle of Friends (Syracuse University Press, 2001)
 Janis and Richard Londraville, eds. John Quinn: Selected Irish Writers from his Library (Syracuse University Press, 2001)
 Murphy, William M., Prodigal Father: the Life of John Butler Yeats (1839–1922) (Ithaca and London: Cornell University Press, 1978; paperback 1979; revised paperback, Syracuse University Press, 2001)
 
 Quinn, John, John Quinn, The Irish Home-rule Convention, An American Opinion, The Macmillan company, 1917 (full text online)

External links
John Quinn papers, 1901-1926, held by the Manuscripts and Archives Division, New York Public Library
John Quinn, 1870-1925: collection of paintings, water colors, drawings and sculpture, Pidgeon Hill Press, 1926 (full text online)
Judith Zilczer, John Quinn and Modern Art Collectors in America, 1913-1924, The American Art Journal, Vol. 14, No. 1 (Winter, 1982), Kennedy Galleries, Inc., pp. 56-71
The Library of John Quinn, complete catalogue of the library of John Quinn: sold by auction in five parts, New York: Anderson Galleries (full text online)

American art collectors
American people of Irish descent
New York (state) lawyers
People from Fostoria, Ohio
1870 births
1924 deaths
University of Michigan alumni
Harvard University alumni
Deaths from colorectal cancer
Deaths from cancer in Ohio
Georgetown University Law Center alumni
19th-century American lawyers
20th-century American lawyers